Ranjini Jose (born 4 April 1984) is an Indian playback singer, lending her voice to several songs in Malayalam, Tamil, Telugu, Kannada and Hindi languages. In a career spanning over 20 years, she has sung in over 200 films and has acted in more than a couple, including the 2017 drama Basheerinte Premalekhanam. After getting a break in the Chorus Peters Chochin Chorus Troupe in 1998, she made her Playback singing debut in the Malayalam cinema Melevaryathe Malakhakkuttikal, beside K. S. Chithra.

Life

Ranjini was born on 4 April 1984 in Chennai to Film producer Babu Jose and singer and bank employee C. K. Jayalakshmi. She was brought up in Chennai, moving to Kochi after a few years. Ranjini did her schooling in three different schools, Sacred Heart Church Park in Chennai, MET Public School in Perumbavoor and Bhavans Vidya Mandir, Elamakkara. She considers her school life to be the most comfortable time of her life, where she grew up listening to various musicians like Ilayaraja, S Janaki and even international artists like ABBA, Boney M and Michael Jackson.

Coming from an artistically inclined family, she always had an interest in performing arts, considering her teachers to be her biggest encouragement. Ranjini would visit film shootings and recordings with her father and mother which gave her a lot of insight into how the industry works.

When Ranjini was in her 9th grade of school, she became a part of the famed Cochin Chorus Troupe, traveling with them and performing the song Unaru Unaru, by S. Janaki. One of her music teachers was Film fare Award-nominated lyricist Santosh Varma. When she was in 12th-grade, she was called for the recording of her first movie, Melevaryathe Malakhakkuttikal directed by Thulasidas, with music composed by Berny-Ignatius, lyrics by Ramesan Nair. She sang with the National Award-winning singer K. S. Chithra, and Santosh Kesav.

Since then, Ranjini 's career took an upward leap, with her singing in over 200 movies across five languages. She made her Tamil debut with the movie Chanakya, her Hindi debut in the movie Khelein Hum Jee Jaan Sey and her Telugu debut with the song Chiru Chilake, by Sharreth, from the movie Naa Bangaaru Talli. She has also acted in three Malayalam films, the 2009 movie Red Achilles starring Mohanlal, the 2010 movie Drona starring Mammootty, and the 2017 movie Basheerinte Premalekhanam.

She has sung for and along with big artists such as Ilayaraja, M Jayachandran, Alphons, Jassie Gift, Deepak Dev, Vishal Bharadwaj, Shankar Mahadevan, and many more.\

In November 2017, Ranjini Jose founded the five-piece band Eka. A longtime dreamchild of hers, the group consists of 5 members, with Ranjini herself on vocals. They do multiple genres, such as Hindustani, Carnatic music, Folk music, Indian pop, and Rock music. They include filmy vernaculars, and also don't shy away from incorporating a few foreign languages into their music. The name of the band stands for something that Ranjini believes spiritually, - "It comes from the mantra, 'Ekam Eva advatheeyam' which says that there is only one power."

In September 2022, Ranjini performed at Campion School Auditorium, Bhopal. Bhopalites enjoyed the multi genre songs that the singer sang. She performed with her band 'Eka'

Personal life 

Ranjini Jose moved to Kochi from her place of birth in Chennai during high school. An only grandchild on her father's side, she used to travel to her parents' homes during vacations. She considers Michael Jackson to be one of her biggest inspirations, along with Alanis Morissette and ABBA. She considers herself lucky to have been able to start her career at the young age of 15 and now works on her band Eka. She tours extensively, performing across India, the Middle East, the United States of America and Europe.She was married to Dj Ram Nair.They got divorced in 2018.

Rumours 
Ranjini Jose fumed through a social media post about the relationship rumours. She stated that when 2 people pose together, it necessarily doesn't mean that they are going to get married. Though homosexulaity isn't a taboo term in Kerala, commenting 'Are they lesbians?' on a picture with a woman she consider elder sister is terrible. She shared this through her instagram video post.  Ranjini spoke up after her pictures with her friend Ranjini Haridas received comments that disrespected their friendship.The interview with both Ranjinis were featured on Grihalakshmi magazine on Friendship Day. She reacted against the comments on that interview too. Ranjini also spoke about the gossiping of yellow media about her relationship with her friend Vijay Yesudas, singer, son of K.J Yesudas, Ganagandharvan.

Partial discography

Filmography

Actress

Television

Notes

References

External links 

 

1984 births
Malayalam playback singers
Living people
People from Kottayam
Actresses in Malayalam cinema
Indian film actresses
Singers from Kerala
20th-century Indian actresses
21st-century Indian actresses
Indian women playback singers
20th-century Indian singers
21st-century Indian singers
20th-century Indian women singers
Film musicians from Kerala
21st-century Indian women singers
Women musicians from Kerala
Tamil playback singers
Telugu playback singers